The Golden Horseshoe Saloon (referred to as Pecos Bill's Golden Horseshoe Saloon during construction) is a restaurant and attraction at Disneyland Park in Anaheim, California in the United States. It opened in 1955 with several other original attractions at Disneyland Park. Over the years the venue has housed multiple stage shows; it currently shows "Showdown at the Golden Horseshoe!" seven days a week.  The "saloon" is located in Frontierland and has a picturesque view of the Rivers of America, New Orleans Square and part of Critter Country.

History
The Golden Horseshoe Stage unofficially opened on July 13, 1955, as the Golden Horseshoe Saloon, when Walt and Lillian Disney, along with dozens of guests, celebrated their 30th anniversary with a private party and the premiere showing of the original Golden Horseshoe Revue.

On Saturday, July 16, 1955, the Golden Horseshoe opened a day early for a private party of corporate sponsors. This show marked Wally Boag's first official performance as Pecos Bill/Traveling Salesman at the Golden Horseshoe Saloon.

The first show to open on the stage was Slue Foot Sue's Golden Horseshoe Revue (mistakenly spelled "Review") on July 17, 1955. The revue's music was written by Charles LaVere, who served as the show's pianist, and used lyrics by Tom Adair. The script for the production was co-authored by two of its stars, Donald Novis and Wally Boag. This variety show ran a record 39,000 times and is listed in the Guinness Book of Records as the longest-running musical of all time.  One of the features of the show was to have children from the audience sing and dance on stage.  "Davy Crockett" was a favorite song performed by the guests.

In 1962, Ron Miller, son-in-law to Walt Disney, directed a made-for-television movie by the same title.  The film starred Disney actress Annette Funicello, Ed Wynn, Betty Taylor, Gene Sheldon, Wally Boag and Walt Disney himself.

Productions

Golden Horseshoe Revue
The Golden Horseshoe Revue was the original and longest running show at the saloon, playing from July 17, 1955 until October 12, 1986.  Over the years it starred Wally Boag, Betty Taylor, Don Novis, Fulton Burley, Dick Hardwick, Frankie Wylie, Jack Watson, Judy Marsh, Burt Henry, Dana Daniels, Jay Meyer, Kirk Wall, Jimmy Adams, Don Payne, Ron Schneider and many others.

The stage show featured saloon owner Slue Foot Sue and her dance hall girls who welcomed the audience with "Hello Everybody", followed by a flirtatious interactive song like "A Lady Has to Mind Her P's and Q's" or "Riverboat Blues".  The show's MC introduced various skits featuring a traveling salesmen, played by Wally Boag, and later Dick Hardwick.

The show would be interrupted by Pecos Bill himself, who would sing his self-titled signature song.

Golden Horseshoe Jamboree Show
This show ran from November 1, 1986, until December 18, 1994. Over the years it starred Judi Wallace, Shirley Harrison, Judy Bell, Kellie Wright, Heather Paige Kent, John Eaden, Don Payne, Gil Christner, E. E. Bell, David Holmes, Joe Jacoby, Eric Gunhus, Kerry Giese, Amanda Hudson and many others. Members of the live band included Bret Simmons, Eric Brenton, Gary Halopoff, Chris Stephens, and many others.

Billy Hill and the Hillbillies

This show began its run on December 22, 1994 and ended on January 6, 2014. In its last approximately year and a half it was performed on the Big Thunder Ranch stage, before the performers were fired, and then re-hired by Knott's Berry Farm.  Over the years it has starred Kirk Wall, Dennis Fetchet, John Marshall, Evan Marshall, John Eaden, Duane Michaels, Rick Storey, Anders Swanson, and many others. It features bluegrass and comedy.

Golden Horseshoe Variety Show
This show featured the comedy and magic talents of Dana Daniels. It ran from June 13, 1995 until October 8, 2003. It starred Dana Daniels, Richard Allen, Hal Ratliff and many others over the years.

Woody's Round-up
This child-friendly show ran from November 21, 1999 until July 17, 2000 and featured characters from the Disney/Pixar movie Toy Story 2. The Golden Horseshoe was also where the music video for the Woody's Round-Up Medley music video starring Riders in the Sky was filmed to promote the Toy Story 2 companion album: Woody's Roundup.

Frontierland: The Little Town That Could

This comedy/melodrama ran occasionally from 2001 until 2003 and featured a supposed history of the founding of Frontierland. It starred players from Laughing Stock and Company, including John Eaden, Kevin Gregg, Ken Parks, Danny Roque and Cory Rouse.

A Salute to the Golden Horseshoe Revue
In late 2012, Disney announced the limited run of a show titled A Salute to the Golden Horseshoe Revue, described as "an homage to those fun-filled, family-friendly musical variety shows of the past". The show was scheduled for a brief run from January 10 to February 4, 2013, every Thursday through Monday. It featured song and dance numbers from the original Golden Horseshoe Revue, such as "Hello, Everybody", "A Good Man Is Hard to Find", "Belly Up to the Bar" and "Can-Can".

Showdown at the Golden Horseshoe
On November 22, 2019 Disney opened a new show called Showdown at the Golden Horseshoe. The show features two dueling piano players.

Other shows

Various other evening entertainments have appeared there over the years, including Alabama, Louis Armstrong, actor Pat O'Brien, various jazz and gospel groups and special events. It was also used during the 1950s as a venue for dancing couples during Disneyland's 'Date Nite' promotion.

And finally it was the venue for the Annual Tour Guide's Fashion Show, which raised money for various children's charities over the years. Park Managers were often brought up on stage to perform (as in posing with a beach ball) with the tour guides. This fact helped sell tickets and kept the show going for many years until the expanded park hours/days pushed the show out.

Architecture

The interior of the saloon was designed by Harper Goff, the same person who designed a saloon set for the movie Calamity Jane starring Doris Day.  Goff was already working on designing exteriors for buildings on Main Street, USA when asked to work on this project.

References

Sources

Citations

External links

Interviews with members of Disneyland's Golden Horseshoe Revue

Walt Disney Parks and Resorts restaurants
Walt Disney Parks and Resorts attractions
Western (genre) amusement rides
Restaurants at Disneyland
Frontierland
1955 establishments in California